Bruce Edward Melnick (born December 5, 1949) is a retired American astronaut and United States Coast Guard officer.  Following retirement from NASA and the Coast Guard, he entered the aerospace industry.  He served as a vice president with the Boeing Co.'s Integrated Defense Systems group, in charge of Boeing's Florida operations at the John F. Kennedy Space Center (KSC). Melnick retired in 2008 and currently resides on Merritt Island, Florida.

Early life and education
Melnick was born December 5, 1949, in New York City, New York, but considers Clearwater, Florida, to be his hometown. He graduated from Clearwater High School, Clearwater, Florida, in 1967. He attended Georgia Institute of Technology for a year, and then went on to receive a Bachelor of Science degree with honors in Engineering from the United States Coast Guard Academy in 1972, and a Master of Science degree in Aeronautical Systems from the University of West Florida in 1975. He was awarded an honorary Doctorate of Science degree from the University of West Florida on 28 April 2001.

Coast Guard career
Melnick spent 20 years in the United States Coast Guard, rising to the rank of commander.  His assignments included serving as operations officer and chief test pilot at the Coast Guard Aircraft Program Office in Grand Prairie, Texas. In that capacity, he conducted most of the developmental and all of the acceptance test flights for the HH-65 Dolphin helicopter, including sea trials, and wrote the HH-65 flight manual.

During his Coast Guard service, Melnick received numerous awards, including two Defense Distinguished Service Medals, two Distinguished Flying Crosses and the Secretary of Transportation Heroism Award.

In 1992, he received the U.S. Coast Guard Academy Distinguished Alumni Award. He logged over 5,000 hours flying time, predominantly in the HH-3F Pelican, HH-52 Sea Guard, HH-65 Dolphin, and T-38 Talon aircraft.  Melnick retired from the U.S. Coast Guard and left NASA in July 1992.

NASA career

Melnick was selected by NASA in 1987 and became an astronaut in August 1988 with the missions STS-41 and STS-49. He was the first Coast Guard aviator to participate in the space program, and was the first Coast Guard aviator into space.
Commander Melnick retired from the U.S. Coast Guard and left NASA in July 1992.

Aerospace-industry career
Melnick is the vice president for Boeing Florida operations at the John F. Kennedy Space Center. Melnick's organization, a part of the Boeing Integrated Defense Systems group, provides a variety of support services to Boeing programs in the state. Headquartered in Titusville, Florida, the organization has approximately 2,400 employees. Services provided by Boeing in Florida include engineering, facilities and maintenance support to NASA and the Department of Defense for the Space Shuttle, International Space Station and Delta rocket programs. Melnick is also responsible for the pursuit of new business for the company in Florida.

Melnick was formerly the Boeing Company vice president, also at the space center, for the payload ground operations contract with NASA, with 1,600 employees. The contract included all the engineering and facilities support and maintenance activities related to preparing spacecraft and/or payloads for the space shuttle missions prior to launch and after landing. The division also provided support to NASA and its contractors for the International Space Station hardware.

Prior to joining Boeing (McDonnell Douglas at the time), Melnick was vice president/director for shuttle engineering at United Space Alliance, formerly Lockheed Martin Space Operations, from 1994 to 1996. From 1992 to 1994, he was director of process improvement technology at Lockheed Space Operations Company.

Affiliations
Memberships:

USCG Academy Alumni Association
USCG Ancient Order of the Pterodactyl
USCG Aviation Hall of Fame
American Institute of Aeronautics and Astronautics
Association of Space Explorers
Coastal Conservation Association
Early and Pioneer Naval Aviators
Florida Sport Fishing Association
Missile, Space & Range Pioneers
National Management Association
Naval Aviation Museum Foundation
North American Hunters Club
United States Space Foundation
Civilian Military Council

Boards of directors:

Astronaut Memorial Planetarium
Crosswinds Youth Services, Inc.
National Space Club
Florida Space Research Institute
Florida Space Authority
Economic Development Commission
Space Coast Cystic Fibrosis Foundation

Board of governors:

Brevard Community College Foundation

Boards of advisors:

University of Central Florida, College of Engineering
Florida Institute of Technology, College of Business
University of West Florida, Institute for Interdisciplinary
Embry Riddle Aeronautical University, Aeronautical Engineering
Study of Human and Machine Cognition

References

Spacefacts biography of Bruce E. Melnick
 https://web.archive.org/web/20100118112208/http://astronautix.com/astros/melnick.htm

1949 births
Living people
United States Coast Guard astronauts
American people of Ukrainian descent
Clearwater High School alumni
United States Coast Guard Academy alumni
University of West Florida alumni
United States Coast Guard officers
United States Coast Guard Aviation
United States Naval Aviators
Recipients of the Distinguished Flying Cross (United States)
Recipients of the Defense Distinguished Service Medal
People from Merritt Island, Florida
Space Shuttle program astronauts